The Heritage of the Desert is a 1924 American silent Western film directed by Irvin Willat and based on the novel of the same name by Zane Grey. It stars Bebe Daniels, Ernest Torrence, and Noah Beery. The film was released by Paramount Pictures with sequences filmed in an early Technicolor process.

Plot
As described in a film magazine review, Jack Hare, an Eastern lad, reaches an outlaw settlement in the far West, and is cast out into the desert by Holderness. Jack is rescued by settler August Naab, against whom Holderness holds a grudge. Jack and Mescal, a ward of August, fall in love, although she is engaged to marry August's youngest son. The latter is killed by Holderness, who kidnaps Mescal. August and his Indian allies raid the outlaw settlement and destroy it. Holderness tries to escape on horseback with Mescal, but Jack pursues and collides with him while on the edge of a precipice, and Holderness plunges to his death. Jack and Mescal are reunited.

Cast

Preservation
A complete print of The Heritage of the Desert is maintained in the Gosfilmofond archive in Moscow.

See also
 List of early color feature films
 List of lost films

References

External links
 
 
 
 Australian daybill long poster
 Accessible version of long poster

1924 films
1924 Western (genre) films
1920s color films
Films based on American novels
Films based on works by Zane Grey
Films directed by Irvin Willat
Paramount Pictures films
Silent films in color
Silent American Western (genre) films
1920s American films
1920s English-language films